The Ionian Railway (Ferrovia Jonica) is an Italian  long railway line that connects Taranto,  with Sibari, Crotone and Reggio Calabria. The route operates through the regions of Apulia, Basilicata and Calabria. The route largely follows the coast of the Ionian Sea.

History

The line was opened in stages between 1866 and 1875.

Developments

On 13 November 1989 the line between Taranto and Sibari was electrified. The line has also been electrified between Melito di Porto Salvo and Reggio Calabria to allow for the operation of a suburban service.

On 12 December 2010 Gabella Grande, Isola Capo Rizzuto, Marconia, San Leonardo di Cutro and Thurio stations were downgraded to halts. On the same date O.G.R di Saline Joniche, Pietrapaola and San Sosthenes stations closed.

On 21 February 2013 the station serving Reggio Calabria Airport opened, linking it to the city. On 9 June 2013 the station Melito di Porto Salvo opened in Annà.

Usage
The line is used by the following service(s):

Intercity services Rome - Naples - Salerno - Taranto
Intercity services Reggio di Calabria - Siderno - Crotone - Sibari - Taranto
Regional services (Treno regionale) Naples - Salerno - Potenza - Metaponto - Taranto
Regional services (Treno regionale) Sibari - Monte Giordano - Metaponto
Regional services (Treno regionale) Sibari - Crotone - Catanzaro Lido
Regional services (Treno regionale) Catanzaro Lido - Roccela Jonica - Reggio di Calabria
Regional services (Treno regionale) Melito di Porto Salvo - Reggio di Calabria - Villa San Giovanni

Stations currently without services

The following stations on the Ionian Railway are currently not served by any railway service:

Scanzano Jonico-Montalbano Jonico (freight trains only)
Sinni (dismissed)
Nova Siri-Rotondella (without any train service)
Rocca Imperiale (without any train service)
Montegiordano (without any train service)
Roseto-Capo Spulico (without any train service)
Amendolara-Oriolo (without any train service)
Toscano (dismissed - regional trains to/from Sibari, Crotone, and Catanzaro Lido call only on the opening days of the Odissea 2000 water park)
Pietrapaola (dismissed)
Roccabernarda (dismissed)
San Sostiene (dismissed)
Capo Spartivento (dismissed)

The following former railway stations on the line have been converted to signalling controls:

Bosco Pineto
Thurio
Gabella Grande
Isola di Capo Rizzuto
San Leonardo di Cutro

References

Footnotes

Sources

See also 
 List of railway lines in Italy

Railway lines in Apulia
Railway lines in Calabria
Railway lines in Basilicata
Railway lines opened in 1866
1866 establishments in Italy